Philippe Vuilque (born 29 January 1956 in Charleville-Mézières, Ardennes) was a member of the National Assembly of France.  He represented the 2nd constituency of the  Ardennes department from 1997 to 2012, as is a member of the Socialiste, radical, citoyen et divers gauche.

References

1956 births
Living people
People from Charleville-Mézières
Politicians from Grand Est
Socialist Party (France) politicians
Deputies of the 11th National Assembly of the French Fifth Republic
Deputies of the 12th National Assembly of the French Fifth Republic
Deputies of the 13th National Assembly of the French Fifth Republic